John Case may refer to:
 John Case (Aristotelian writer) (died 1600), English Aristotelian writer
 John Case (astrologer) (1660–1700), English astrologer and quack doctor
 John Case (athlete) (1889–1975), American track and field athlete
 John Case (novelist), pseudonym for Jim Hougan (born 1942) and Carolyn Hougan (1943–2007) 
 John Higley Case (1832–1890), American politician
 John S. Case (1823–1902), Republican politician from Maine
 John Carol Case (1923–2012), English baritone

See also
John Case Schaeffer II (born 1946), American musician
John Casey (disambiguation)